Hynhamia ochroleuca is a species of moth of the family Tortricidae. It is found in Costa Rica.

The length of the forewings is 11.5–13 mm for males and 11.5–15 mm for females. The ground colour of the forewings is yellowish cream, with small irregular patches of darker yellow, densely sprinkled with ochreous brown and sparsely dotted with black. The hindwings are cream, tinged pale brownish on the periphery and strigulated (finely streaked) with blackish grey.

The species was reared from a pupa found on the bark of Quercus oleodies.

Etymology
The species name refers to the pale ochreous colour or the forewings.

References

Moths described in 2004
Hynhamia